Pioniers is a baseball and softball team based in Hoofddorp, the Netherlands.  The club is currently sponsored by Raamsdonkveer-based construction company Vaessen BV and the team is officially known as the Vaessen Pioniers.

Pioniers baseball team plays in the Honkbal Hoofdklasse, the top level of professional baseball in the Netherlands. The club's most successful year was 1997 they reached the Holland Series for the first time in the club's history by beating reigning champions DOOR Neptunus in the play-offs. In the Holland Series they claimed a 3-2 victory over Mr. Cocker HCAW, making them Dutch champions. In 2006 Pioniers finished third in the Honkbal Hoofdklasse and were just like in 1997 able to upset Neptunus in the play-offs, gaining themselves entrance to the 2006 Holland Series. In those series they twice took the lead, to eventually lose to Corendon Kinheim 3-2.

The team is attempting to attract three Major League Baseball regular season games for the opening of its new stadium in 2014. The stadium will be capable of expanding to temporarily accommodate 30,000.

2015 roster

Source: KNBSBStats.nl

References

External links
 Official website

Baseball teams in the Netherlands
Softball teams in the Netherlands
Sports clubs in North Holland
Sport in Haarlemmermeer